Lester James Graham (July 1, 1916 – December 17, 1963) was an American football player. 

A native of Hominy, Oklahoma, Graham attended Hominy High School and then played college football at Tulsa.

He also played professional football in the National Football League (NFL) as a guard for the Detroit Lions. He appeared in 11 NFL games, two as a starter, during the 1938 season.

References

1916 births
1967 deaths
People from Hominy, Oklahoma
American football guards
Tulsa Golden Hurricane football players
Detroit Lions players
Players of American football from Oklahoma